The 1979 Major League Baseball All-Star Game was the 50th playing of the midsummer classic between the all-stars of the American League (AL) and National League (NL), the two leagues constituting Major League Baseball.

It was held on Tuesday, July 17, at the Kingdome in Seattle, Washington, the home of the third-year Seattle Mariners of the American League. The National League won  for their eighth 

The game featured memorable defensive play by outfielder Dave Parker, as he had two assists on putouts: one at third base and one at home plate.  With Parker receiving the MVP award for this game, and teammate Willie Stargell winning the National League MVP, NLCS MVP, and World Series MVP, all four possible MVP awards for the season were won by members of the Pittsburgh Pirates.  The game was also notable for the play of Lee Mazzilli, providing the margin of victory. In his only All-Star appearance, Mazzilli tied the game in the eighth inning with a pinch hit home run off of Jim Kern of the Texas Rangers, and then put the National League ahead for good in the ninth, drawing a bases-loaded walk against Ron Guidry of the New York Yankees.

This was the only time the Kingdome hosted the All-Star Game.  When it returned to Seattle for a second time in 2001, the Mariners had moved to their new home at Safeco Field.

Rosters
Players in italics have since been inducted into the National Baseball Hall of Fame.

National League

American League

Game

Umpires

Starting lineups

Game summary

American League starter Nolan Ryan began the game in sizzling fashion, striking out Davey Lopes and Dave Parker, but then walked Steve Garvey. Mike Schmidt tripled in Garvey, and George Foster followed with a double down the right field line to score Schmidt for a 2–0 National League lead.

The American Leaguers came right back in their half of the first inning.  George Brett walked with one out, Don Baylor doubled him in, and Fred Lynn put the AL up 3–2 with a two-out, two-run homer off Steve Carlton.

The NL regained the lead on a bases-loaded sacrifice fly by Parker in the second and an RBI groundout by Dave Winfield in the third. The AL went back up 5–4 in the bottom of the third when Carl Yastrzemski batted in a run with a single and Chet Lemon scored on a Schmidt error.

The score remained that way until the sixth, when the NL tied it back up at 5–5 on a Winfield double off Mark Clear and an RBI single by Gary Carter.  Pete Rose pinch-hit in the sixth and bounced into a double play, and then entered the game, replacing Garvey at first and becoming the first player to appear in the All-Star Game at five different positions.

The AL went back up 6–5 in their half of the sixth. Gaylord Perry gave up a leadoff single to Yastrzemski, a double to Darrell Porter, and an RBI single to Bruce Bochte before leaving in favor of Joe Sambito without retiring a batter.  Sambito pitched the NL out of trouble by getting Reggie Jackson to ground to Lopes at second, who gunned down Porter at the plate.  After an intentional walk to Roy Smalley to load the bases, Sambito retired Brett and was relieved by Mike LaCoss.  LaCoss then induced Baylor to hit into a force play end the inning.

In the seventh, Jim Rice led off and blooped a double to right, but was thrown out by Parker as he tried to stretch it into a triple. Lee Mazzilli, batting for Gary Matthews, tied the score at 6–6 in the NL half of the eighth with an opposite-field homer off Jim Kern for the first pinch-hit home run in MLB All-Star game history.

The AL and mounted one last threat in the bottom of the eighth; Brian Downing led off with a single off Bruce Sutter and was sacrificed to second.  Sutter walked Jackson intentionally and then struck out Bobby Grich for the second out.  Graig Nettles then lined a single to right, and Downing attempted to score, but once again the arm of Parker claimed another victim.  Parker fired a perfect strike to Carter, who blocked Downing from reaching the plate.  Along with his other assist an inning earlier, this play earned Parker the game's MVP award.

The NL took the lead for good in the ninth, without recording a base hit. Joe Morgan walked with one out and was balked to second.  Kern walked Parker intentionally, and retired Craig Reynolds on a foul pop but then walked Ron Cey to load the bases. Ron Guidry came in but walked Mazzilli, forcing in Morgan with the winning run.  Sutter retired the side, including two strikeouts, in the ninth to get the win.

Footnotes and references

External links
Baseball-Reference.com
Lineups, boxscore, and more

Major League Baseball All-Star Game
Major League Baseball All-Star Game
Baseball competitions in Seattle
Major League Baseball All Star Game
July 1979 sports events in the United States
1970s in Seattle